Araiocypris batodes is a very small cyprinid fish endemic to Vietnam. It is the only known member of its genus.

References

Cyprinid fish of Asia
Endemic fauna of Vietnam
Fish of Vietnam
Fish described in 2008